Kurt Boo is a Swedish sprint canoeist who competed in the late 1930s. He won a silver medal in the K-2 1000 m event at the 1938 ICF Canoe Sprint World Championships in Vaxholm.

References

Swedish male canoeists
Year of birth missing
Year of death missing
ICF Canoe Sprint World Championships medalists in kayak